Talking Machine is an indies demo EP of Japanese rock band 9mm Parabellum Bullet. All of the songs listed appeared again on later releases.

Track list

Personnel
Takuro Sugawara – lead vocals, lyricist, rhythm guitar, acoustic guitar (track 6)
Yoshimitsu Taki – backing vocals, lead guitar
Kazuhiko Nakamura – bass guitar, screaming (tracks 1 and 12)
Chihiro Kamijo – drums

References

2004 EPs
9mm Parabellum Bullet albums